Drawn to the Deep End is a studio album by English indie rock band Gene. It was released in March 1997. The album was reissued in double disc deluxe editions containing extra materials on 3 February 2014.

Critical reception

Jack Rabid of AllMusic called the album "a total, total knockout", adding "Drawn to the Deep End, as its title implies, is an emotional onslaught, a flood of raw, unfettered, and unfiltered human feeling, an exquisite ebb and flow of earthquakes and temporary serenity" and stating that it was an "early favorite for 1997's LP of the year."

Track listing

Personnel
Martin Rossiter - vocals, piano
Steve Mason - guitar
Kevin Miles - bass
Matt James - drums

References

1997 albums
Gene (band) albums